The 2014 Jackson State Tigers football team  represented Jackson State University in the 2014 NCAA Division I FCS football season. The Tigers were led by first-year head coach Harold Jackson and played their home games at Mississippi Veterans Memorial Stadium. They were a member of the East Division of the Southwestern Athletic Conference. They finished the season 5–7, 3–6 in SWAC play to finish in a tie for third place in the East Division.

Schedule

References

Jackson State
Jackson State Tigers football seasons
Jackson State Tigers football